The following is a list of notable events and releases of the year 1950 in Norwegian music.

Events

Deaths

 February
 23 – Cally Monrad, singer, actress, and poet (born 1879).

 March
 6 – Vilhelm Dybwad, songswriter, barrister and writer of comedies and revues (born 1863).

 April
 5 – William Farre, composer (born 1874).
 6 – Signe Lund, composer (born 1868).

Births

 January
 5 – Halvdan Sivertsen, singer-songwriter and guitarist.
 28 – Gro Anita Schønn, singer and actor (died 2001).

 April
 4 – Andris Snortheim, children's musician (died 2016).
 5 – Bent Åserud, guitarist and film score composer.
 17 – Åse Hedstrøm, contemporary composer.

 May
 3 – Dag Arnesen, jazz pianist with a series of album releases.
 9 – Kjell Solem, musician (died 2010)
 26 – Ragnar Olsen, writer and folk singer.

 June
 21 – Trygve Thue, guitarist and music producer.
 28 – Guttorm Guttormsen, jazz flautist, saxophonist, music arranger, and composer.

 July
 29 – Trond Granlund, rock and folk singer, composer and guitarist.

August
 6 – John Pål Inderberg, jazz saxophonist and composer.
 8 – Synne Skouen, music writer and composer.

 September
 5 – Kari Svendsen, singer, banjo player and revue artist.

 December
 5 – Sveinung Hovensjø,  jazz  bass-guitarist and guitarist
 8 – Bjørn Kjellemyr, jazz upright bassist.
 21 – Lillebjørn Nilsen, guitarist, singer, and songwriter

See also
 1950 in Norway
 Music of Norway

References

 
Norwegian music
Norwegian
Music
1950s in Norwegian music